Javier Pérez Polo (born 11 October 1996) is a Spanish taekwondo athlete. He won the gold medal at the 2018 Mediterranean Games in the Men's 68 kg weight category.

He represented Spain at the 2020 Summer Olympics in the men's 68 kg weight category.

He won the gold medal in the men's 68 kg event at the 2022 Mediterranean Games held in Oran, Algeria.

References

External links 
 

Spanish male taekwondo practitioners
Living people
1996 births
Mediterranean Games gold medalists for Spain
Mediterranean Games medalists in taekwondo
Competitors at the 2018 Mediterranean Games
Competitors at the 2022 Mediterranean Games
World Taekwondo Championships medalists
Taekwondo practitioners at the 2020 Summer Olympics
Olympic taekwondo practitioners of Spain
21st-century Spanish people